Kinnoull Parish Church is a Church of Scotland church in the Kinnoull area of Perth, Perth and Kinross, Scotland. A Kinnoull Church appears in documents when it was granted to Cambuskenneth Abbey in 1361. It was rebuilt in 1779 but demolished in 1826 after the completion of a church on the Perth side of the River Tay, which flows a short distance behind the church. 

Standing on Dundee Road, today's church was built in 1827, but the remains of the earlier 1635 church, which is a scheduled ancient monument, can be seen in its northern wall, which is now part of the enclosure of the family burial ground. Included in the historic designation are the remains of the church, the burial aisle, churchyard and its boundary wall and the gravestones within the churchyard.

The church was designed by William Burn.

The Kinnoull family's vault is beneath the church floor, and a monument to George Hay, 1st Earl of Kinnoull, is inside the church. It shows Hay "dressed in his Lord Chancellor's robes, standing within an ivy-clad Corinthian portico, with a table on which rests the Great Seal of Scotland. Above is an intricate heraldic panel, supported by fruit, unicorns, shields and spearhead finials."

The church's electric organ was unveiled by Dr Albert Lister Peace on 23 April 1896. It was a gift of Mrs Jasmine F. Fuller, of Rosebank. The organ is the work of the Hope–Jones Organ Company of Birkenhead. The organ cases were designed by Perth architect David Smart.

Notable burials
 Effie Gray, wife of the critic John Ruskin, is buried in the churchyard. Gray's father donated the Millais window, the West window, to the Church in 1870. It is based on designs drawn by John Everett Millais, whom Gray left Ruskin for Gray's 20-year-old son, George, is also buried in the kirkyard

Gallery

See also
Scheduled monuments in Perth and Kinross
List of listed buildings in Perth, Scotland

References

External links

Scheduled Ancient Monuments in Perth and Kinross
19th-century Church of Scotland church buildings
Churches completed in 1827
Churches in Perth, Scotland
Listed churches in Scotland
Listed buildings in Perth, Scotland